Türkmən (also, Tyurkman) is a village in the Qabala Rayon of Azerbaijan.

References 

Populated places in Qabala District